Croczilla (also known as Million Dollar Crocodile or The Crocodile) is a 2012 Chinese monster movie directed by Lin Lisheng. The film stars Barbie Shu, 
Guo Tao, Lam Suet and is about a group of people seeking a crocodile that has swallowed a million yuan.

The film was released on June 8, 2012 and was promoted in some media as China's first monster movie.

Plot
The film tells the story of an 8-meter long crocodile on the rampage in Hangzhou. Xiao befriends Amao, a 36-foot crocodile, who lives on his father's crocodile sanctuary. Soon his father is forced to sell the crocodiles to a gangster who plans to use them for high-priced meals. The story begins as the crocodile is released, swallows a fortune won by a local woman who forces the police to hunt it, and begins to terrorize the local town.

Release
Croczilla was shown as a "work-in-progress" print at Marché du Film at the Cannes Film Festival in May 2012. Australian sales firm Odin's Eye Entertainment picked up the rights to Croczilla. The film was released in China on June 8, 2012. Croczilla was the opening film at the 36th Montreal World Film Festival.

Notes

External links
 
Million Dollar Crocodile at Rotten Tomatoes

2012 films
Chinese horror films
2010s monster movies
2012 horror films